John de Hotham (or Hodum; died 1361) was an English medieval college head and university chancellor.

John de Hotham was Provost of The Queen's College, Oxford, from 1350 to 1361. He was for two periods Chancellor of the University of Oxford between 1357 and 1360. He was buried at Chinnor in Oxfordshire, originally in the chancel of the church.

References

Year of birth unknown
1361 deaths
Provosts of The Queen's College, Oxford
Chancellors of the University of Oxford
14th-century English people
14th-century Roman Catholics